Larry Mowry (born October 20, 1936) is an American professional golfer who played on the PGA Tour and Senior PGA Tour (now known as the Champions Tour).

Mowry was born in San Diego, California. He turned pro in 1959. Mowry spent most his regular career as a club professional. He played on the PGA Tour full-time for several years in the 1960s. He won the 1968 Rebel Yell Open and finished T-2 at the 1969 Azalea Open Invitational. His best finish in a major was a T-11 at the 1969 PGA Championship.

Mowry's win at the 1987 Crestar Classic made him the first player in Senior PGA Tour history to win an event after making it through the rigors of Monday qualifying. That victory also made him the first former club professional to post an official Senior PGA Tour win. The biggest win of Mowry's career came at the 1989 Senior PGA Championship, which was held at the PGA National Golf Course in Palm Beach Gardens, Florida.

Mowry is married, and has two adult children and five grandchildren.

Professional wins (10)

Senior PGA Tour wins (5)

Other wins (5)
1968 Rebel Yell Open
1969 Magnolia State Classic
1979 Florida Open, Colorado Open
1983 Florida Open

Senior major championships

Wins (1)

References

External links

American male golfers
PGA Tour golfers
PGA Tour Champions golfers
Winners of senior major golf championships
Golfers from San Diego
1936 births
Living people